Samuel Soler Martin (born May 18, 1979, in Plasencia, Cáceres) is an S3 swimmer from Spain.   He competed at the 2000 Summer Paralympics, winning a bronze medal in the 200 meter freestyle race. He raced at the 2004 Summer Paralympics where he did not medal.

References 

Spanish male freestyle swimmers
Living people
1979 births
Paralympic bronze medalists for Spain
Swimmers at the 2000 Summer Paralympics
Swimmers at the 2004 Summer Paralympics
Paralympic medalists in swimming
Medalists at the 2000 Summer Paralympics
Paralympic swimmers of Spain
People from Plasencia
Sportspeople from the Province of Cáceres
S3-classified Paralympic swimmers